Sylvia E. Perez (born November 17, 1961) is an American news anchor. Based in Chicago, Perez currently anchors the weekday editions and special segments of Good Day Chicago on WFLD-TV (FOX 32) since October 2016. From 1989 until 2013, Perez co–anchored the 11AM newscast on Chicago's WLS-TV (ABC 7) alongside Linda Yu. Perez was also the station's "Healthbeat" reporter covering daily health and medical investigative stories for the 4PM and 10PM newscasts.

Career
A graduate of the University of Oklahoma School of Journalism, Perez began her career in 1983. Prior to joining ABC7, Sylvia worked in Houston and Amarillo, Texas. She also worked in Oklahoma where she won several awards for her reporting. Sylvia's interest in medical reporting came when she worked at KPRC-TV in Houston, where she also became the weekend co-anchor. She still does that while in Chicago. Ms Perez is the youngest of five children, and an "army brat," the highlight of her career came when covering the 50th anniversary of Pearl Harbor. There she followed an Illinois veteran back to Hawaii to visit the  where his brother and many other American war heroes died.

Perez first joined ABC 7 in June 1989. On June 20, 2013, Sylvia was released from WLS-TV after 24 years with the station because they decided to cancel the 11am newscast. The 11am news she anchored with Linda Yu was cancelled in September in favor of Windy City Live (WCL), which moved to the timeslot after Live with Kelly and Michael moved to the 9am slot from WGN-TV. In September 2016, media critic Robert Feder announced on his blog that Perez had been hired to anchor the weekend morning newscasts on WFLD-TV. Perez also reports for the daily 9 p.m. newscast.

Other ventures and personal
After leaving ABC7, Perez formed her own production company, Sylvia Perez Productions, where she offers video training, media coaching and other media services to non-profits around the Chicago area. Perez currently resides in the suburbs of Chicago with her husband Daniel Blasdell. In March 2016, Perez put her Hinsdale, Illinois mansion back on the market for $1.95 million dollars, previously selling the property for $2.4 million in 2013. Perez purchased the home in 2006.

References

Television anchors from Chicago
Television anchors from Houston
1961 births
Living people